Robsart is a ghost town in Lincoln County, New Mexico, United States, which is located west of the Lincoln National Forest on Highway 54, north of the town of Carrizozo.

Robsart is served by the Southern Pacific Railway; little remains of Robsart but the Robsart Siding.

Robsart may have been named by the Southern Pacific Railway after Amy Robsart from the Sir Walter Scott book Kenilworth, as Robsart, Saskatchewan received its name from the Canadian Pacific Railway.

Robsart Tank

Robsart Tank is a reservoir which gets its name from the nearby unincorporated area, Robsart.

References

External links

History of Lincoln County, New Mexico
Ghost towns in New Mexico
Geography of Lincoln County, New Mexico